The nucleus of the trochlear nerve is a motor nucleus in the medial midbrain giving rise to the trochlear nerve (cranial nerve IV).

Anatomy 
The trochlear nucleus is located in the caudal rostral midbrain (s. mesencephalon), at an intercollicular level between the superior colliculus and inferior colliculus. As with all motor nuclei of cranial nerves, it is located near the midline (i.e. in the medial midbrain). It is embedded within the medial longitudinal fasciculus. It is located beneath the cerebral aqueduct. It is situated immediately below the nucleus of the oculomotor nerve (CN III) (the only other cranial nerve with a nucleus in the midbrain besides the mesencephalic nucleus of trigeminal nerve) which functions in preserving dentition.

The trochlear nucleus is unique in that its axons run dorsally and cross the midline at the trochlear decussation (located in the superior medullary velum) in the midbrain before emerging from the brainstem posteriorly/dorsally. A lesion of the trochlear nucleus thus affects the contralateral eye, whereas lesions of all other cranial nuclei affect the ipsilateral side.

Blood supply 
The midbrain receives its arterial blood supply from the posterior cerebral artery, superior cerebellar artery, and basilar artery; disruption of blood flow through any of these vessels may disrupt blood supply to the trochlear nucleus.

See also
 Trochlear nerve

Additional images

References

External links
  - "Brainstem, Cranial Nerve Nuclei, Sagittal Section, Medial View"

Midbrain